Lucas Parize dos Santos (born 8 May 1995) is a footballer who plays as a midfielder for Los Caimanes. Born in Peru, he represented Brazil at the 2019 Summer Universiade.

Career statistics

Club

Notes

References

1995 births
Living people
Brazilian footballers
Peruvian footballers
Peruvian people of Brazilian descent
Peruvian expatriate footballers
Brazilian expatriate footballers
Association football midfielders
SV Waldhof Mannheim players
SC Fortuna Köln players
Sport Victoria players
Los Caimanes footballers
Peruvian expatriate sportspeople in Germany
Brazilian expatriate sportspeople in Germany
Expatriate footballers in Germany
Universiade medalists in football
Universiade silver medalists for Brazil
Medalists at the 2019 Summer Universiade